Edmund White (29 January 1928 – 6 March 2004) was an English cricketer. White was a right-handed batsman who fielded as a wicket-keeper. He was born at Lee, London.

White made his first-class debut for Northamptonshire against Glamorgan in the 1946 County Championship. He made a further first-class appearance in 1947 against the Combined Services, before making a final appearance against Essex in the 1948 County Championship. In his three first-class matches, he scored 44 runs at an average of 11.00, with a high score of 16.

He died at Stoke Mandeville Hospital, in Aylesbury, Buckinghamshire on 6 March 2004.

References

External links
Edmund White at ESPNcricinfo
Edmund White at CricketArchive

1928 births
2004 deaths
People from Lee, London
Cricketers from Greater London
English cricketers
Northamptonshire cricketers
Wicket-keepers